European of the Year may refer to:

 European of the Year (European Voice award)
 European of the Year (Reader's Digest award)
 European of the Year (Trombinoscope award)